57 Tauri, also known as h Tauri and V483 Tauri, is a star 148 light years from the Earth, in the constellation Taurus. It is a 5th magnitude star, so it will be visible to the naked eye of an observer located far from city lights. 57 Tauri is a member of the Hyades star cluster. It is a Delta Scuti variable star, whose brightness changes slightly, ranging from magnitude 5.55 to 5.59.

In 1908, Lewis Boss listed 57 Tauri as a member of the Hyades cluster based upon its proper motion agreeing with the motions of other cluster members. Its membership in the cluster was firmly established forty-four years later by Hendrik van Bueren, using both proper motion and radial velocity. 57 Tauri is located 10.8 light years from the core of the Hyades cluster.

Robert Millis discovered that 57 Tauri is a variable star, in 1967. He reported that the amplitude varied by 0.02 magnitudes with a period of 1.5 hours. In 1972, it was given the variable star designation V483 Tauri. A year 2000 study of 57 Tauri, based on 54 nights of photometric data, identified twelve pulsation frequencies ranging in period from 58.6 minutes to 6.17 days.

In 1999, Anthony Kaye discovered that 57 Tauri is a spectroscopic binary by examining 139 high signal-to-noise spectra obtained at Kitt Peak.

References

Taurus (constellation)
020219
027397
Tauri, V483
1351
Delta Scuti variables
F-type subgiants